Juan Ramón Sánchez Guinot (1957 – April 10, 2008) was a Spanish actor, singer, sculptor and painter who played Chema the baker in the Spanish Sesame Street co-production Barrio Sésamo.

Biography
During the mid 1970s, Sánchez performed in a music group, Red de San Luis.

Sánchez began his career on the TV series El señor Villanueva y su gente, before becoming one of the most beloved human stars of Barrio Sésamo in the 1980s.

While acting in Barrio Sésamo, Sánchez also appeared in a small role as a male nurse in Pedro Almodóvar's 1986 movie Matador. Sánchez has also appeared as a guest actor on the Spanish TV series Farmacia de guardia and Los ladrones van a la oficina.

Alongside with his wife Vivares and other actors from the series (such as José Riesgo), Sánchez appeared in a stage version of Barrio Sésamo during the late 1980s, touring through Spain.

More recently, Sánchez performed on stage and met with some success as a painter. He nevertheless admitted that people still called him "Chema".

His last television performance was on Gala Infantil 2006, in a "¿Como están ustedes?" ("How are you?") segment. With Espinete, Don Pimpón, and Ana, he sang the Barrio Sésamo theme "Todos los del barrio" for the last time.

Personal life
Sánchez was married to Chelo Vivares, the actress who performed the full-bodied Muppet Espinete on Barrio Sésamo. They married before the beginning of their work together in 1983.

Death
Sánchez died as a result of lung cancer in Madrid on April 10, 2008. He was 51 years old.

References

External links

 

1957 births
2008 deaths
People from the Province of Guadalajara
Spanish male television actors
Spanish male stage actors
Spanish male film actors
Spanish male painters
Spanish male sculptors
20th-century Spanish male actors
20th-century Spanish male singers
20th-century Spanish singers
20th-century Spanish male artists
21st-century Spanish male actors
21st-century Spanish male singers
21st-century Spanish singers
21st-century Spanish male artists
Deaths from lung cancer in Spain